Francisco Casimiro Marcó del Pont y Ángel (June 25, 1770 – May 19, 1819) was a Spanish soldier and the last Governor of Chile. He was one of the main figures of the Chilean independence process, being the final Spaniard to rule as Royal Governor of Chile from 1815 to 1817, when he was deposed and captured by the patriot forces after the Battle of Chacabuco.

Early career
Marcó del Pont was born in Vigo, Galicia, Spain, the son of Buenaventura Marcó del Pont y Porí and of Juana Ángel Díaz y Méndez. He began a brilliant military career by joining the Infantry Regiment of Zaragoza. He served with distinction during the Peninsular War against Napoleon, achieving the rank of General before being taken prisoner during the capture of Valencia in 1809. He was tried by a French military tribunal and sentenced to death, with the possibility of saving his life by swearing loyalty to the invading power. He refused and thus won the respect of Joseph Bonaparte, who commuted his sentence to life imprisonment.

In 1814, Marcó del Pont was liberated as a consequence of the general retreat of the French forces from Spain. He was still quite young, being under 45 years old, when he was promoted to the rank of Field Marshal, and appointed military chief and governor of Tortosa. In September 1815 he was promoted to Captain General and Royal Governor of Chile, where he arrived to take over his position on December 26 of the same year.

Governor of Chile
In 1815 Marco del Pont was named Governor of the then-Spanish colony of Chile, arriving at Valparaíso at the end of the year. Once he assumed the head of the Reconquista government he sent spies to Cuyo in order to obtain information about the Army of the Andes being amassed by exiled pro-independence leaders such as Bernardo O'Higgins in the Argentine province of Mendoza. This army, under José de San Martín, would later cross the Andes to liberate Chile. Internally, he sought to solidify Spanish control through the brutal repression of all those associated with the independence movement who had remained in Chile. A number of notables were deported to the barren Juan Fernández Islands, and others suffered the depredations of group of soldiers led by the infamous captain Vicente San Bruno.

Marco del Pont's rule ended on February 12, 1817, when the defeat of the Royalist forces under the command of Rafael Maroto in the Battle of Chacabuco allowed the patriot forces to enter the capital. The governor Marco del Pont tried to escape to Valparaíso to catch a transport leaving for Peru, but he was intercepted by an advance column of the patriot army at an hacienda called "Las Tablas" near El Quisco. After his capture, he was interviewed by San Martín, who sent him to Mendoza and later San Luis.  His days ended after a final move to the hacienda of Pedro Ignacio de Mujica, near Renca, in Luján a city close to Buenos Aires, when he died in prison in 1819.

Additional information

See also

Chilean War of Independence
Mariano Osorio
Rafael Maroto
Vicente San Bruno
Antonio de Quintanilla
Juan Francisco Meneses
Ventura Miguel Marcó del Pont

Sources

1770 births
1819 deaths
People from Vigo
Royal Governors of Chile
Knights of Santiago
Spanish generals
People of the Chilean War of Independence
Royalists in the Hispanic American Revolution
Spanish commanders of the Napoleonic Wars